Colossal Head is the eighth studio album by the rock band Los Lobos. It was released in 1996 on Warner Bros. Records.

Track listing

Personnel 
Los Lobos
 David Hidalgo – vocals, guitar, accordion, fiddle, requinto jarocho
 Louie Pérez – vocals, guitar, drums, jarana
 Cesar Rosas – vocals, guitar, bajo sexto
 Conrad Lozano – vocals, bass, guitarron
 Steve Berlin – keyboards, horns
Additional musicians
 Victor Bisetti – drums, percussion
 Pete Thomas – drums
 Efrain Toro – percussion
 Yuka Honda – keyboards, samples 
Production
 Mitchell Froom – producer 
 Tchad Blake – producer, engineer  
 Los Lobos – producer 
 John Paterno – engineer  
 Tom Recchion – art direction, design
 Jim Douglas – photographer

References

Los Lobos albums
1996 albums
Albums produced by Tchad Blake
Albums produced by Mitchell Froom
Warner Records albums
Roots rock albums
Avant-pop albums